Bobby Starr (born January 19, 1937 - March 17, 2022) was an American R&B and soul singer; formerly a lead singer for the R&B group, The Intruders.

Biography
Born and raised in Baltimore, Maryland, Bobby Starr toured with a variety of vocal groups as a teen before forming Bobby Starr and the Versatilles.  His recordings with the five member vocal group include the single "Fanny, Fanny."  While on tour he met Philadelphia recording group The Intruders.  Noted for his similar sound to The Intruders' lead singer Samuel Brown, the group recruited Starr to replace Brown when he opted out to spend time with his family. Starr's addition to The Intruders in 1970 reignited their string of hit singles including tracks from the "When We Get Married" album.  His leads include a cover of Dusty Springfield's "A Brand New Me" and the album version of "When We Get Married."  Starr's first single release with The Intruders on the "Gamble" record label in 1971 was "I'm Girl Scoutin." Starr made his national television debut with The Intruders on November 13, 1971 performing "Cowboys to Girls" and "I Bet He Don't Love You" on Soul Train.  The Intruders disbanded in the 1980s and reformed under the direction of Glenn Montgomery.  Bobby Starr returned as lead singer and the group continues to tour today. He is featured on tour with The Intruders on the "Love Train: Sound of Philadelphia" concert series. Bobby Starr's charitable endeavors include support for education and public television.  His recent appearances include the P.B.S TV special "Superstars of 70's Soul Live."

Starr died on March 17, 2022.

Discography

Bobby Starr and The Versatiles Singles
"Fanny, Fanny" (1968)

The Intruders Singles
"When We Get Married" (Album Version)(1970)
"This Is My Love Song" (1970)
"I'm Girl Scoutin" (1971)
"I Bet He Don't Love You" (1971)
"Win Place or Show (She's A Winner)" (1973)
"Talking About Pop" (2002)
"How Long Has It Been" (2002)

Albums with The Intruders
"When We Get Married" (Gamble 1970)

Footnotes

References
A Touch of Classic Soul: Vol, 1: Soul singers of the early 1970s by Marc Taylor.  (Publication: Aloiv Publishing, New York (U.S.), 1996)
A House On Fire: The Rise and Fall of Philadelphia Soul by John A. Jackson,  (Publication: New York Oxford University Press (U.S.), 2004)
Rock On Volume 2 by Norm N. Nite,  (Publication: Harper & Row, Publishers  New York (U.S.), 1984)

External links
The Intruders official page

Living people
Philadelphia International Records artists
1937 births
21st-century African-American women singers
20th-century African-American women singers